Miguel Ángel Quevedo y de la Lastra (July 31, 1908 – August 12, 1969) was the publisher and editor of Bohemia Magazine, the most popular news-weekly of its day in Cuba and Latin America, known for its political journalism and editorial writing.

In May 1908, Quevedo's father, Miguel Ángel Quevedo y Pérez, first published the magazine Bohemia, which he named after his favorite opera, La bohème, by Giacomo Puccini. The magazine folded after a few issues but returned in 1910 and became one of Cuba's most popular weeklies within a few years. Due to failing health, Quevedo Pérez turned over the running of Bohemia to his son, Quevedo de la Lastra (then only eighteen years old), on January 1, 1927. Almost immediately, the young Quevedo became one of the principle voices of opposition to the dictatorship of Gerardo Machado, a distinction for which he was jailed several times in the early 1930s. The young Quevedo also became a vocal critic of the myriad dictatorships that gripped Latin America in the 1930s and 1940s. By the 1950s, Quevedo and Bohemia led the mainstream Cuban press in denouncing the dictatorship of Fulgencio Batista and supported the insurrection and revolution against Batista's regime. On July 26, 1958 the magazine published the Sierra Maestra Manifesto, a document that purported to unify the opposition groups fighting Batista. On January 11, 1959, one million copies of a special edition of the magazine were printed, and sold out in just a few hours.

Quevedo sought political asylum in the Venezuelan embassy in Havana in the summer of 1960 and arrived in Miami on September 7, 1960. The following month he published Bohemia Libre with $40,000 monthly from the U.S. State Department until after the failed Bay of Pigs invasion in April 1961. The magazine was subsequently edited in Miami, Florida, San Juan, Puerto Rico, and Caracas, Venezuela. On August 12, 1969, weeks after his publication went bankrupt and he was heavily indebted to loan sharks and had cashed large checks without funds, the inveterate bachelor committed suicide in the Caracas apartment that he shared with his sister Rosa Margarita Quevedo. He shot himself in the right temple with a 38 caliber revolver. Next to his body was found a letter to "the competent authorities and to public opinion" saying that "absolutely no one should be blamed for his death." He "begged forgiveness from anyone he may have offended in any way." Another letter was addressed to his sister, who heard the gunshot in his bedroom while she was in the kitchen.

After his death, journalist Ernesto Montaner published in Miami an apocryphal suicide letter from Quevedo stating that Bohemia Magazine invented the 20,000 figure that is commonly cited for the number of deaths under Fulgencio Batista's regime. The original letter or its facsimile has never appeared and journalist Agustin Tamargo denounced it as a fraud by Montaner.

References

External links
https://web.archive.org/web/20081010165028/http://www.babalublog.com/archives/001452.html
https://web.archive.org/web/20120425015229/http://www.economiaparatodos.com.ar/ver_nota.php?nota=657

1908 births
1969 suicides
20th-century journalists
Cuban journalists
Male journalists
Maria Moors Cabot Prize winners
Cuban emigrants to Venezuela
Suicides by firearm in Venezuela